Georgy Sergeev was a Soviet designer of artillery and rocket systems, Hero of Socialist Labor.

Biography
Georgy Ivanovich Sergeev was born on August 30, 1911 in the city of Taganrog.

In 1932 Sergeev graduated from the Taganrog Aviation College.

In 1932-1937 worked at Bolshevik Plant no. 232. In 1938-1942 worked at Stalingrad's military factory Barrikady Industrial Association. Under direction of the chief designer Ilya Ivanovich Ivanov he participated in construction of:

 280 mm mortar M1939 (Br-5)
 210 mm gun M1939 (Br-17)
 305 mm howitzer M1939 (Br-18)
 450 mm howitzer (Br-23)
 76 mm divisional gun M1939 (USV)

After evacuation of the factory from Stalingrad to Yurga, Sergeev worked at the Yurga Machine-Building Plant.

In 1945-1950 worked at Leningrad's Bolshevik Plant no. 232. In 1950-1958 worked at the Barrikady Industrial Association in Stalingrad, where he was promoted to the position of the chief of the Special Design Bureau (SKB-221 in 1950). In 1959 Georgy Sergeev was promoted to the post of the Chief Designer of OKB-221. In 1959-1963 Sergeev was involved into design works of the first Soviet missile system mounted on army trucks FROG-7.

In the 1970s Georgy Sergeev was Chief Designer of the missile systems RT-21 Temp 2S, OTR-21 Tochka, OTR-23 Oka and 203 mm 2A44 gun for the self-propelled gun 2S7 Pion. In 1975 for his contribution into design of the 2S7 Pion, Sergeev was awarded the title of Hero of Socialist Labor.

Georgy Sergeev retired on August 9, 1984 and died on March 15, 1988.

Awards
 Hero of Socialist Labor (1975)
 Stalin Prize (1946)
 Lenin Prize (1966)
 Order of Lenin (twice)
 Order of October Revolution (1981)
 Order of the Red Star (1944)
 Order of the Red Banner of Labour (2)
 Medal "For the Defence of Stalingrad" (1942)

1911 births
1988 deaths
People from Taganrog
People from Don Host Oblast
Russian inventors
Heroes of Socialist Labour
Recipients of the USSR State Prize
Stalin Prize winners
Lenin Prize winners